Babloo Bachelor is a 2021 Indian Hindi-language film directed by Agnidev Chatterjee, starring Sharman Joshi, Pooja Chopra, and Tejashri Pradhan. The soundtrack is composed by Jeet Gannguli and Indradip Dasgupta. The film released on 22 October 2021.

Plot
This film is based in Kanpur Uttar Pradesh, where a middle class family always dreamed of their son's wedding. Babloo has met with a few girls hoping to find his bride, but none of the girls were right. Finally Babloo met Avantika, who had 5 boyfriends before meeting Babloo. Avantika requests Babloo to reject the proposal and Babloo rejects her for marriage. After one month at a cousin's wedding, Babloo met Swati, who he ends up falling in love with, eventually proposing. On their suhaag raat (First wedding night), Swati runs away after mixing sleeping pill in Babloo's drink and  leaving Babloo a letter. Babloo sees an ad on newspaper about the shows of Swati, and traveled to Mumbai to find her and bring her home back. While in Mumbai, Babloo runs into Avantika, where he tells Avantika his feelings about Swati and agrees to help him win her back. While speaking with Avantika, Babloo realizes she is a good person regardless of her past engagements, leaving Babloo to choose between two women.

Cast
 Sharman Joshi as Babloo
 Pooja Chopra as Avantika
 Tejashri Pradhan as Swati	
 Rajesh Sharma as Babloo's Father
 Leena Prabhu as Babloo's Mother
 Neeraj Khetarpal as  Babloo's Chacha
 Sumit Gulati as Babloo's Friend
 Beena Bhat as Babloo's Sister
 Raju Kher as Prabhat
 Charu Rohatgi as Prabhat Wife
 Sweety Walia as Sharman Bua
 Manoj Joshi as Phopa
 Akash Dhabade as Friend
 Dolly Chawla as Bua's Daughter
 Asrani as Broker
 Puneet Vashist as Village Boy
 Deepali Sharma as Ankh Marne wali Girl
 Ashok Awasthi as Ankh Marne wali girl's father
 Mousumi Dutta as Gymnastic Girl
 Deepali Singh as Feet Attack Girl
 Mukesh Padhya as Feet Attack girl's father
 Nidhi Vikram as Bhabhi

Soundtrack 

The soundtrack was composed by Jeet Gannguli and Indradip Dasgupta lyrics written by Rashmi Virag, Kumaar and Ashish Pandit.

References

External links
 
 

2021 films
Hindi-language drama films
Indian drama films
Films directed by Agnidev Chatterjee
2020s Hindi-language films
Films scored by Jeet Ganguly
Films scored by Indradeep Dasgupta